Sonchat Ratiwatana and Sanchai Ratiwatana were the defending champions of the Men's Doubles competition of the 2011 Southeast Asian Games but lost to Do Minh Quan and Ngo Huang Huy in the quarterfinals. Christopher Rungkat and Elbert Sie won the title by beating Treat Conrad Huey and Cecil Mamiit 2–6, 6–2, [10–7] in the final.

Medalists

Draw

Seeds
All seeds received bye to the quarterfinals.

  Sanchai Ratiwatana /  Sonchat Ratiwatana (quarterfinals)
  Danai Udomchoke /  Kittipong Wachiramanowong (semifinals)
  Christopher Rungkat /  Elbert Sie (champion)
  Aditya Hari Sasongko /  David Agung Susanto (quarterfinals)

Main draw

References
Draw
SEAG2011 Start/Result Lists - Tennis

Men's Doubles